Khanfir District , Khanfyr District or Khanfar District is a district of the Abyan Governorate, Yemen. As of 2003, the district had a population of 109,044 inhabitants.

References

Districts of Abyan Governorate